Ewald Kist (born 22 January 1944) is a Dutch former field hockey player. He competed in the men's tournament at the 1968 Summer Olympics.

References

External links
 

1944 births
Living people
Dutch male field hockey players
Olympic field hockey players of the Netherlands
Field hockey players at the 1968 Summer Olympics
People from Wassenaar
Sportspeople from South Holland
20th-century Dutch people